Walis (Walissima) is a natural plant fiber obtained from the plant Sida rhombifolia, of the Malvaceae family. It is produced mainly in the Philippine islands.

Properties 
The fibers are white, soft, and lustrous, and have good tensile strength. Walis is similar to jute in appearance.

Use 
Walis is used for cordage and coarser cloths.

References 

Fiber plants
Fibers
Sida (plant)